Esquire Jauchem is a producer, director, writer, and designer working in theater, opera, ballet, film, and video. In 1971 he founded The Boston Repertory Theater.  In 1975, he adapted and directed the world premiere of the stage version of Harry Nilsson's The Point! starring David Morse as the character Oblio. He has produced over 1,000 television programs, most recently the Supervising Producer of Clean House starring Niecy Nash and the Co-Executive Producer of Home Made Simple starring Paige Davis.  Both of those shows received Emmy nominations.

Early life 

Jauchem was born in Akron, Ohio, where his father was a machinist at Goodyear Tire and his mother was a beauty queen and housewife.  His acting and directing career started in his grandmother's garage where he staged mini-theatrical events.  His maternal grandparents were from Zics, Hungary, the paternal side from Biermansdorf, Switzerland. Jauchem attended Harvey S. Firestone High School and went to The Defiance College where he studied theology, made his first film, and became deeply involved in the theater department led by Professor William Curtis.  In the summer of 1964 he was an actor with the Defiance College Players performing in Barnstable, Massachusetts. After graduating from college, he moved to Boston to attend Emerson College, but very shortly became involved in the Opera Company of Boston productions led by world-famous impresario Sarah Caldwell who offered him a full-time job.

Theatre 

At the age of twenty-four Jauchem founded the Boston Repertory Theatre which, over the next ten years, became the most successful local theater company in Boston, originating over 40 shows with James Kirkwood Jr., Tommy Tune, Viveca Lindfors and Dick Shawn among the known performers, and kickstarting the careers of newcomers including David Morse (an original founding member of the Company).  The resident acting company performed several plays in true rotating repertory, often two different shows in the same day.  The Boston Rep built the first new theatre in the Boston Theater District in thirty years at One Boylston Place and opened it for the national bi-centennial in 1976 with the world premiere of Kurt Vonnegut's Player Piano.

Opera 

Jauchem was also the Associate Director and Production Administrator of the Opera Company of Boston with world-renowned conductor and director, Sarah Caldwell.  He helped her stage many American premieres including The Trojans by Berlioz, Russlan and Ludmilla by Glinka, The Icebreak by Sir Michael Tippett, and the epic, War and Peace by Prokofiev (which featured the entire Boston Rep acting company in key, non-singing roles).  Opera singers with whom he worked include Beverly Sills, Régine Crespin, Plácido Domingo, James McCracken, Donald Gramm, Victoria de los Ángeles, and Shirley Verrett.  Jauchem also became known for creating elaborate special effects Sarah Caldwell's productions and also often appeared onstage in the productions.

Moving to New York, he and Gregory Meeh founded Jauchem & Meeh Special Effects which has, for several decades, been dazzling opera and theatre audiences with storms, explosions, magic, and illusions.  His special effects with Gregory Meeh vividly destroyed Troy, Moscow,  and the Temple of Solomon, then burned Beverly Sills at the stake.

Hollywood 

Moving to Venice Beach, California, Jauchem became involved in electronic media where he has produced and/ or directed over one thousand episodes of television for NBC, CBC, Spike, UPN, E! Entertainment, Style, Logo, and The Oprah Winfrey Network.  He was the Supervising Producer for the wildly successful comedy/makeover show, Clean House starring Niecy Nash.  That show was number one for the network for several years and resulted in two Emmy nominations for Jauchem, and generated a spin-off  special "The Messiest House" achieving the highest ratings in the history of Style.

He continued his work in the theatre producing, directing and designing scenery, lighting and costumes including another production of The Point! and The Little Prince starring David Morse as The Aviator.

Recent projects 

In recent  years he has written and directed multimedia stage tributes to Paula Vogel, Marsha Norman and David Henry Hwang for William Inge Theater Festival and was most recently the Supervising Producer of RuPaul’s Drag U on Logo TV and the Co-Executive Producer / Showrunner of Home Made Simple starring Paige Davis on the Oprah Winfrey Network that was nominated for an Emmy.

He is in currently pre-production on a short film based on award-winning playwright, David Henry Hwang’s play, Bondage.  He is developing an independent feature film Down by the River slated to star David Morse and Kimberly Elise, screenplay by Gerald Berns, based on a play by William Curtis.  Jauchem is also developing a cabaret style musical based on the music of Stew and Heidi Rodewald and writing an adaptation of "The Mad Woman of Chaillot" set on the Venice Beach Boardwalk.

Occupations 
Founder and Artistic Director of the Boston Repertory Theatre
Associate Director and Production Administrator of the Opera Company of Boston with Director Sarah Caldwell
Co-Founder of Jauchem & Meeh Special Effects (with Gregory Meeh), which is known for its work in opera, on Broadway, and in Las Vegas.
General Manager of The Big Apple Circus, NYC
Co-Producer "American – Soviet Festival: Making Music Together", Sarah Caldwell, Director

Selected works

TV/Film

Theater

Opera

Festivals/casino/tours

References

External links

Information at LinkedIn

Living people
American theatre managers and producers
1947 births